The Studio Art Building is a building on the Reed College campus in Portland, Oregon, in the United States. Its lower level was built in 1980, and renovations in 2001 increased the building's size by 4,800 square feet.

See also
 List of Reed College buildings

References

External links
 

1980 establishments in Oregon
University and college buildings completed in 1980
Reed College buildings
University and college academic buildings in the United States